Saint-Josse-ten-Noode Cemetery is a cemetery belonging to Saint-Josse-ten-Noode in Brussels, Belgium, where the municipality's inhabitants have the right to be buried. It is not located in Saint-Josse itself, but in the neighbouring municipality of Schaerbeek.

Notable interments

Personalities buried there include:
 Edouard Agneessens (1842–1885), painter
 Jean-Baptiste Madou (1796–1877), painter and lithographer
 Charles Rogier (1800–1885), statesman
 Eugène Van Bemmel (1824–1880), author and educator
 André Van Hasselt (1806–1874), writer and poet

Gallery

See also
 List of cemeteries in Belgium
 Brussels Cemetery
 Ixelles Cemetery
 Laeken Cemetery
 Molenbeek-Saint-Jean Cemetery
 Schaerbeek Cemetery

External links

 

Cemeteries in Belgium
Buildings and structures in Brussels
Geography of Brussels
Culture in Brussels
Saint-Josse-ten-Noode
Schaerbeek